Jackson v Royal Bank of Scotland [2005] UKHL 3 is an English contract law case, which concerns remoteness of damage.

Facts
Mr James Jackson was a partner with Barrie Stewart Davies (by the time, passed on), trading under the name "Samson Lancastrian". They imported dog chews from Thailand and sold them to a firm called "Economy Bag". They both had the same bank, the Royal Bank of Scotland. By mistake, RBS sent Economy Bag a document showing that Jackson was making a 19% markup on every transaction. Feeling cheated, they cancelled the business relationship with Jackson and Davies. Jackson sued RBS for the loss of the opportunity to make further profits.

At first instance, Jackson won, since the relationship would have continued for four more years on a decreasing scale, and after then further dealings would just be speculative.

The Court of Appeal held that damages should be limited to one year of the breach, and all other losses were too remote. Jackson appealed, arguing that one year was based on an error of principle, and in fact RBS's liability was open ended. RBS argued that no loss at all was foreseeable, because it was not within its reasonable contemplation that accidental disclosure would lead to the relationship being terminated.

Judgment
The House of Lords held that the loss of future orders was not too remote, and that Jackson had an obvious commercial interest in retaining confidential information. The point of damages for breach of contract with RBS, to which Jackson was entitled, was to put him in the position as if there had been no breach.

On the issue of remoteness, the judge's assessment was a good one, in that it was increasingly likely as time passed that Economy Bag would want to squeeze Jackson's profit margins. To avoid further cost, that award (four years) would be restored.

Lord Walker made some interesting observations on the rule in Hadley v Baxendale.

See also
Hadley v Baxendale (1854) 9 Exch 341
The Achilleas

Notes

English remedy case law
House of Lords cases
2005 in case law
2005 in British law
NatWest Group litigation